Mago is a village Panchayat in Thingbu Tehsil of Tawang district in the north-eastern state of Arunachal Pradesh, India.

Location 
It is 35 km from Tawang, 55 km from Bomdila, 151.3 km from Arunachal Pradesh state capital Itanagar, and 179.4 km from Assam state capital Dispur. Nearest airports are Tezpur Airport (123 km) and Zero Airport (160 km).
It is located on the  proposed Mago-Thingbu to Vijaynagar Arunachal Pradesh Frontier Highway along the McMahon Line,  alignment map of which can be seen here and here.

See also

 North-East Frontier Agency
 List of people from Arunachal Pradesh
 Religion in Arunachal Pradesh
 Cuisine of Arunachal Pradesh
 List of institutions of higher education in Arunachal Pradesh

References 

Villages in Tawang district